Phellinus gilvus is a fungal plant pathogen which infects several hosts. In traditional Chinese medicine, it is known as sanghuang and is used to treat stomachaches and cancer; polysaccharides isolated from lab-grown P. gilvus have been shown to inhibit the growth of melanoma in a mouse model.

See also
 List of apricot diseases
 List of black walnut diseases
 List of Platanus diseases
 List of sweetgum diseases
 List of peach and nectarine diseases
 List of mango diseases

References

Fungal tree pathogens and diseases
Stone fruit tree diseases
Nut tree diseases
Mango tree diseases
gilvus
Fungi described in 1822
Taxa named by Lewis David de Schweinitz